Lynn Boylan (born 29 November 1976) is an Irish Sinn Féin politician who has served as a Senator for the Agricultural Panel since April 2020. She previously served as a Member of the European Parliament (MEP) for the Dublin constituency from 2014 to 2019.

Early life
Boylan grew up in the Kilnamanagh area of Tallaght. Initially studying journalism and gaining a certificate, she went on to earn post-certificate qualifications from University College Dublin in Environmental Impact Assessment and European Environmental Conservation Management.

Early political career

In 2005, Boylan moved to County Kerry while working as a coordinator for the Irish Wildlife Trust at Killarney National Park. That same year she joined Sinn Féin.

Under her Irish-language name Lynn Ní Bhaoighealláin,
she stood at the 2007 general election as the Sinn Féin candidate in the Kerry South constituency. With only 3.5% of the first-preference votes, she was eliminated on the first count.  
At the 2009 local elections, she stood for the Killarney local electoral area of Kerry County Council, but was again unsuccessful. She attributed her defeats to being an outsider: "As a Dub in Kerry the odds were stacked against me", she told the Irish Times in 2014.

Boylan returned to Dublin in 2011 to work in Ballymun, for the Global Action Plan, an environmental initiative funded by Ballymun Regeneration. In 2010, she was appointed as chair of the advisory board of Safefood.

In September 2013, Boylan was selected as the Sinn Féin candidate for the Dublin constituency at the European Parliament election in May 2014. She then left her job, and as a candidate was paid a wage by Sinn Féin while she went canvassing three or four times a day.

Boylan began her campaign "practically anonymous", according to Sinn Féin president Gerry Adams. By April, Boylan was still described by the Irish Independent newspaper as a "political unknown". Instead of raising her media profile, Boylan's campaign concentrated on canvassing, mostly door-to-door rather than the busier shopping centres.

Despite the lack of media exposure, by late May the polls showed Boylan in the lead. After voting on 23 May, Boylan won 23.6% of the first preference votes, and was elected on the third count.

As the election count pointed towards Boylan's win, the Fianna Fáil candidate Mary Fitzpatrick asked: "Who could have said somebody would come from nowhere, no track record in Dublin, and still take the lead and steal the first seat and probably have a surplus?".

Member of the European Parliament
Boylan was a campaigner
for the release of Ibrahim Halawa, an Irish citizen from Firhouse in South Dublin who was imprisoned in Egypt between 2013 and 2017
and was adopted by Amnesty International as a prisoner of conscience.
In March 2015, Boylan described Halawa as an "Irish-speaking, GAA-playing Dublin lad", and asked if the Irish Government would do more if his name was "Paddy Murphy". In December 2015, Boylan sponsored a motion in the European Parliament calling Halawa's release. She introduced his two sisters to the Parliament before the vote, which passed by over 560 votes to 11.

She lost her seat at the 2019 European Parliament election.

Senator
Boylan was elected to the Seanad in April 2020 as a Senator for the Agricultural Panel. She was the Sinn Féin candidate at the 2021 Dublin Bay South by-election. She was not elected, getting 4,245 first-preference votes (15.8%).

Personal life
Boylan is the partner of Eoin Ó Broin, who has been the Sinn Féin TD for Dublin Mid-West since 2016. They live in Clondalkin, South Dublin.

References

External links

Lynn Boylan's page on the VoteWatch website

1976 births
Living people
Alumni of University College Dublin
Irish socialists
Members of the 26th Seanad
21st-century women members of Seanad Éireann
MEPs for the Republic of Ireland 2014–2019
People from South Dublin (county)
Sinn Féin MEPs
Sinn Féin senators
21st-century women MEPs for the Republic of Ireland